The Ryfylke Tunnel is an undersea road tunnel in Rogaland county, Norway. It is part of the Norwegian National Road 13 running between Stavanger and Ryfylke (district) under the Horgefjord (part of the Boknafjord). The tunnel is part of the Ryfast project.

The tunnel is designed for 10,000 vehicles per day and is built with one tube for each traffic-direction, and two vehicular lanes in each tube. The entrance on the "city side" is on Hundvåg island in  Stavanger municipality. Construction began in 2013, and the tunnel opened on 30 December 2019. A half marathon was held in the tunnel on 5 October 2019.

Toll charging
Zero-emission vehicles received a 50% discount. Tariff group 2 (large goods vehicles) incurred  (about $46).

References

External links
  Norwegian Public Roads Administration Norwegian Roadmaps

Subsea tunnels in Norway
Road tunnels in Rogaland
Norwegian National Road 13
Strand, Norway
Transport in Stavanger